Perle is a first-generation nuclear attack submarine of the French Navy. The boat is the sixth and last of the Rubis series. Construction began on the submarine on 27 March 1987. The boat was launched on 22 September 1990 and entered active duty service on 7 July 1993.

History
The boat was deployed in the Royal Navy Auriga 2010 exercise alongside seven Royal Navy warships and one United States Navy destroyer.

2020 fire
On 12 June 2020 at 10:35 a.m., a fire started at bow of Perle, while in drydock for maintenance and repair at the military port of Toulon. The fire was reported as under control at 9:36 PM. Firefighters flooded the rear compartments of the submarine with foam. At least 30 specialist naval fighters and a fireboat were involved. There were no reported injuries in the fire. Since the submarine's 48 megawatt pressurized water nuclear reactor had been removed when it entered the drydock in January 2020, there was no risk of radioactive contamination.

In October 2020 it was announced that the submarine would be repaired using the forward section of her decommissioned sister boat, . The repair was to begin in January 2021 with envisaged completion in 2023.

In October 2021, the joining of the forward section of Saphir with Perle was said to have been completed and the submarine was transferred from the Cherbourg shipyard back to Toulon to resume her original refit where it had been interrupted by the June 2020 fire.easy. The joining of the forward section of Saphir to Perle involved about 100,000 hours of study and more than 250,000 hours of work. At the end of the process, the submarine's displacement increased by 68 tonnes and her length by about one meter.

Perle was scheduled for continued work through 2022 with sea trials envisaged toward the end of the year and a return to operational service in the first half of 2023.

2022 fire
While continuing refit in dry dock at the arsenal in Toulon, Perle experienced another fire on 26 September 2022.  Prior to the fire, the submarine had been slated to return to service in the first quarter of 2023. On 17 November 2022, the submarine left dry dock to continue her tests prior to an envisaged start of sea trials.

See also 
 List of submarines of France

Notes and references 

 Sous-marin nucléaire d'attaque Perle netmarine.net

Rubis-class submarines
Submarines of France
Ships built in France
1990 ships